Prahlada is a figure in Hindu mythology. 

Prahlad, Prahalada, or Prahlada may also refer to:
 Prahlada (film), a 1941 film
 Prahalada (film), a 1939 film
 Prahlad (film), the 1931 film
 Prahlada (scientist), an Indian missile scientist.